Gudhurathuge Niyaa is a 1993 Maldivian film co-directed by Fazeen Ahmed and Hassan Haleem. Produced by Ahmed Manik, the film stars Fazeen Ahmed, Shaila Fazeen, Ahmed Sharumeel and Zahwan Zaid in pivotal roles.

Premise
Sameena (Aminath Didi), a preservative single mother is desperate to find the ideal wife for her young, carefree son, Ibrahim Riyaz (Fazeen Ahmed). Sameena, aided by the greedy woman, Hareera (Sithi Fulhu) introduces him to a young woman, Pareeza (Saeedha), whom he scares off saying he is mentally unstable. Meanwhile, Riyaz initiates a romantic relationship with Nihama Waheed (Shaila Fazeen) who initially fails to impress Sameena with her modern attire. Soon after the confusion was cleared and the couple gets married.

Meanwhile, the heartbroken Romeo Qadhir, (Mohamed Arif) is determined to break off their marriage with the help of Hareera. One night, on his way back home, Riyaz crashes into Mahmood’s (Ahmed Sharumeel) pick-up and dies due to his severe injuries while Nihama is revealed to be pregnant. Nihama gives birth to a boy, Mahthu. At the age of three, Mahthu befriends with Mahmood unbeknownst to each other of their family rivalry. Qadhir makes it his life mission to eliminate Mahmood from his unrequited love equation.

Cast 
 Fazeen Ahmed as Ibrahim Riyaz
 Shaila Fazeen as Nihama Waheed
 Ahmed Sharumeel as Mahmood
 Zahwan Zaid as Mahthu
 Aminath Didi as Sameena
 Aishath Waheedha as Raziyya
 Sithi Fulhu as Hareera
 Mohamed Arif as Qadhir
 Saeedha as Pareeza
 Mohamed Shareef as Doctor
 Amir as Lahchey
 Ibrahim Shakir as Police Inspector

Soundtrack

Reception
The film received mixed reviews from critics where the child actor's mature performance and Sithi Fulhu's comical performance in the film were particularly praised by the audience.

References

Maldivian romantic drama films
1993 romantic drama films
Dhivehi-language films